The Carroll House Hotel on Monroe St. in Fullerton, North Dakota was listed on the National Register of Historic Places in 1994.  The listing included three contributing buildings which included Shingle Style architecture and Second Empire architecture.

History
Carroll House Hotel was built in 1889. The hotel was named for Carroll Fuller Sweet (1877-1955), son of  the hotel owner Sofia (Fuller) Sweet 
(1854-1923) and her husband  Grand Rapids, Michigan   mayor  Edwin Forrest Sweet (1847-1935). 

According to its NRHP nomination, "the Carroll House Hotel is locally significant in the area of commerce, because it was among the first businesses located in the Fullerton community, and it is the only extant and best preserved example of a hotel and restaurant from the late nineteenth century."  Also its "architectural composition, one of restraint and simplicity, represents the Second Empire and Shingle styles from this period. Few changes have occurred with the building, resulting in a high degree of integrity."

In 1981, the Carroll House was purchased by the Fullerton Community Betterment Association which  restored the building. It now operates as a bed-and-breakfast.

References

Hotel buildings on the National Register of Historic Places in North Dakota
Second Empire architecture in North Dakota
Shingle Style architecture in North Dakota
Hotel buildings completed in 1889
National Register of Historic Places in Dickey County, North Dakota
1889 establishments in North Dakota